US Highway 127 (US 127) is a part of the United States Numbered Highway System that runs from Chattanooga, Tennessee, to the Lower Peninsula of Michigan. In Ohio, the highway runs  from the Ohio River in Cincinnati to the Michigan state line north of West Unity. US 127 runs south to north in Ohio's westernmost counties along the border of Indiana. The highway is a main route connecting many small towns, including eight county seats. The highway was first designated in 1926. Its route ended in downtown Toledo before being realigned to its current route in 1930.

Route description
US 127 enters Ohio from the Kentucky via the Clay Wade Bailey Bridge, which also carries US 42 and US 25 north across the Ohio River into Cincinnati. Upon entering Ohio, US 25 ends and US 127 and US 42 continue through Downtown as a series of one-way pairs until reaching Central Parkway. At this point, US 42 heads east on the parkway while US 127 follows the roadway north. As US 127 continues north, it passes one block west of Washington Park and Findlay Market in Over-the-Rhine and marks the neighborhood's western boundary.

US 127 then turns onto the Ludlow Viaduct over Mill Creek near the junction of I-75 and I-74; it becomes Hamilton Avenue at its end.  At this point, US 127 becomes a predominantly four-lane surface street. As Hamilton Avenue, US 127 is the major north–south artery and commercial corridor in Cincinnati's Northside and College Hill neighborhoods, and then the inner suburban cities of North College Hill and Mt. Healthy.  Shortly after an interchange with I-275, US 127 passes through Fairfield then reaches downtown Hamilton. In Hamilton, US 127 widens to a four-lane road just south of downtown before returning to a two-lane road at the northern edge of New Miami. From this point, US 127 roughly parallels Sevenmile Creek until it reaches Eaton.

Along this section of the route US 127 is a two-lane rural highway surrounded by farms. Approaching Greenville, the road widens to a four-lane limited access highway, serving as a bypass to the east of the city. The road returns to a rural two-lane road and continues north to Celina, skirting the western edge of Grand Lake St. Marys and the associated state park. US 127 serves as Main Street in Celina, the county seat of Mercer County. Just north of Celina, the highway intersects US 33, which connects Ft. Wayne, Indiana, with Columbus, and then US 127 continues to Van Wert. In Van Wert, US 127 is Washington Street and serves as the main road through the city's business district. The Lincoln Highway intersects US 127 one block west of the county courthouse. In the northern part of the city, US 127 has a partial cloverleaf interchange with US 30 and US 224. US 224 joins US 127 and continues north briefly before US 224 turns to the east and US 127 continues due north toward Paulding. In Paulding, US 127 bends to the northwest to cross Flatrock Creek before reaching the courthouse and turning back to the north on Williams Street. North of the city, and just south of the Maumee River, the highway intersects US 24, a limited-access highway between Toledo, Ohio and Fort Wayne, at a diamond interchange before crossing the river. US 127 intersects US 6, the Grand Army of the Republic Highway and with State Route 15 (SR 15) becomes Main Street in Bryan. At the northern city limit, SR 15 continues north to the Ohio Turnpike while US 127 begins a northeast route toward West Unity. After passing under the turnpike, US 127 has a brief concurrency with US 20 and then enters Michigan to the north in rural Lenawee County.

History
By 1912, the current US 127 corridor in Ohio existed as a series of inter-county highways running from Cincinnati to Michigan. By 1917, significant sections of the route was paved, especially near the county seats and the section from Eaton to Hamilton. In 1923, state highways were numbered and signed for the first time in Ohio. The current US 127 route was designated SR 9 from Cincinnati to Bryan and SR 108 from Bryan to the Michigan state line.

The United States Numbered Highway System was introduced in 1926. US 127 was designated to run from US 27 in Jackson, Michigan, to downtown Toledo via Monroe Street, and was later designated SR 51. Four years later, the route of US 127 was changed to reach Cincinnati. The original highway was re-numbered US 223. The new route for US 127 would move to its current alignment from along former SR 9 and former SR 108. At this time, SR 9 from Bryan to the Michigan state line became part of SR 15. The route remains mostly unchanged since 1930. US 127 still serves as a main surface street in the towns along its route, which includes eight county seats.

Future
From 2011 to 2015, there had been 45 vehicle accidents, and from 2011 to 2016, three fatalities at the intersection of US 127 and Kruckeberg Road in Greenville Township, Darke County, along Greenville's bypass. After public calls for intersection improvements, the Ohio Department of Transportation (ODOT) offered six options at a public meeting on January 24, 2017. On June 15, 2017, ODOT announced that the intersection would be converted to a (standard) restricted crossing U-turn (RCUT, also known as a superstreet), but termed by ODOT as a "partial RCUT", at a cost of just over $748,000, with construction slated to begin in summer 2019. A superstreet already exists along the SR 4 Bypass in nearby Butler County.

There is a $2.4 million project north of the city of Van Wert to replace the current intersection of US 127, US 224 and Marsh Road (County Road 13) with a roundabout. The project began in January 2022 and is expected to be complete in October.

Major intersections

References

External links

27-1
 Ohio
Transportation in Hamilton County, Ohio
Transportation in Butler County, Ohio
Transportation in Preble County, Ohio
Transportation in Darke County, Ohio
Transportation in Mercer County, Ohio
Transportation in Van Wert County, Ohio
Transportation in Paulding County, Ohio
Transportation in Defiance County, Ohio
Transportation in Williams County, Ohio
Transportation in Fulton County, Ohio